The Matti Äyräpää Prize is a Finnish prize in medicine awarded by The Finnish Medical Society Duodecim since 1969. It is named after the dentist Matti Äyräpää, who was Duodecim's first chairman.

In 2016, the prize money was €20,000.

Recipients
1969 – Eino Kulonen
1970 – Kauko Vainio
1971 – Esko Nikkilä
1972 – Olli Mäkelä
1973 – Olavi Eränkö
1974 – Kari Penttinen
1975 – Lauri Saxén
1976 – Erkki Klemola
1977 – Kari Kivirikko
1978 – Kari Cantell 
1979 – Bror-Axel Lamberg
1980 – Pirjo Mäkelä
1981 – Markku Seppälä
1982 – Reijo Vihko
1983 – Eero Saksela
1984 – Tatu Miettinen
1985 – Antti Vaheri
1986 – Olli Jänne
1987 – Mikko Hallman
1988 – Pekka Häyry
1989 – Pekka Halonen
1990 – Albert de la Chapelle
1991 – Leevi Kääriäinen 
1992 – Tapani Luukkainen 
1993 – Mårten Wikström 
1994 – Juhani Jänne
1995 – Jouni Uitto
1996 – Leena Palotie
1997 – Carl G. Gahmberg
1998 – Kari Alitalo
1999 – Ilpo Huhtaniemi
2000 – Pekka Saikku
2001 – Riitta Hari
2002 – Matti Haltia
2003 – Kai Simons
2004 – Petri Kovanen
2005 – Kimmo Kontula
2006 – Lauri A. Aaltonen
2007 – Markku Laakso
2008 – Sirpa Jalkanen
2009 – Seppo Ylä-Herttuala
2010 – Jorma Viikari
2011 – Juha Kere
2012 – Heikki Joensuu
2013 – Taina Pihlajaniemi
2014 – Leif Groop
2015 – Heikki Huikuri
2016 – Erika Isolauri

See also

 List of medicine awards

Footnotes

References

Medicine awards
Awards established in 1969
Finnish awards